Haut les cœurs! is a 1999 French-Belgian drama film directed by Sólveig Anspach, starring Karin Viard and Laurent Lucas. Viard won the César Award for Best Actress and the Lumières Award for Best Actress for her performance in the film.

Cast 
 Karin Viard as Emma 
 Laurent Lucas as Simon 
 Claire Wauthion as Emma's mother 
 Julien Cottereau as Olivier

References

External links 
 

1999 films
1999 drama films
1990s French-language films
French drama films
Films directed by Sólveig Anspach
Films featuring a Best Actress César Award-winning performance
Films featuring a Best Actress Lumières Award-winning performance
Belgian drama films
French-language Belgian films
1990s French films